King’s Valley is a platform game released by Konami for MSX in 1985. The game is considered a spiritual successor to Konami's earlier arcade game Tutankham (1982), employing similar concepts such as treasure hunting in Egyptian tombs and an identical end-level music tune. It also has similarities to Lode Runner (1983).

The game was initially released on ROM cartridge with 15 levels. It was also planned to be released on floppy disk with 60 levels but that version was shelved. The floppy disk version would ultimately be released a few years later in 1988 as part of Konami Game Collection Vol. 1 on MSX.

Gameplay
As an intrepid adventurer, the player's goal is to collect various gems, while evading angry mummies and other monsters long enough to find the exit to the next level.  A port to MS-DOS was made by a Korean company named APROMAN which supports monochrome and CGA graphic cards.

Legacy
A sequel King's Valley II was released for the MSX in two versions, each specifically designed for the MSX and MSX2 respectively.

See also
Pharaoh's Revenge (1988)

References

1985 video games
MSX games
DOS games
Konami franchises
Konami games
Video games set in Egypt
Video game clones
Platform games
Video games developed in Japan